The sulphur-winged parakeet (Pyrrhura hoffmanni), also known as Hoffmann's conure in aviculture, is a species of bird in subfamily Arinae of the family Psittacidae, the African and New World parrots. It is found in Costa Rica and Panama.

Taxonomy and systematics

The sulphur-winged parakeet has two subspecies, the nominate P. h. hoffmanni (Cabanis, 1861) and P. h. gaudens (Bangs, 1906).

It is named for the German naturalist Karl Hoffmann.

Description

The sexes are the same. Adults of the nominate subspecies are mostly green. Their head, nape, and throat have some yellow inclusions; bare white skin surrounds their eye and their ear coverts are bright terracotta. Their breast has a dull orange wash. Their wing is mostly green with yellow primary coverts, inner primaries, and outer secondaries; the outer primaries are blue. Their tail's upperside is rufous olive with green fringes on the feathers; its underside is reddish brown. Immature birds have duller scaling, less orange on their breast, and much less yellow on their wings. Subspecies P. h. gaudens has some orange-red markings on its head and its underparts are slightly darker than those of the nominate.

Distribution and habitat

The nominate subspecies of the sulphur-winged parakeet is found in the Cordillera de Talamanca  and the Dota region of southern Costa Rica. P. h. gaudens is found in western Panama as far east as Veraguas Province. The species inhabits primary and logged montane forest and adjacent shrubby areas and secondary forest. In elevation it ranges from  but usually occurs above .

Behavior

Movement

The sulphur-winged parakeet moves from the upper elevations to the lower during the wet season, and sometimes makes daily elevational moves between roosting and feeding sites.

Feeding

The sulphur-winged parakeet typically forages in small flocks in the forest canopy. Its diet is primarily the fruits and seeds of a variety of plants and trees.

Breeding

The sulphur-winged parakeet is believed to nest mainly between January and June. In captivity the clutch size is six eggs, the incubation period 24 days, and fledging 10 weeks after hatch.

Vocalization

The sulphur-winged parakeet's most common call is "a series of high-pitched shrill notes, e.g. “krree krree krree” " that is given both from a perch and in flight. It is shrill but not screechy in contrast to that of other Pyrrhura parakeets. Perched birds are often silent. Flocks in flight "call frequently and simultaneously, producing a noisy, harsh and piercing chattering."

Status

The IUCN has assessed the sulphur-winged parakeet as being of Least Concern. Though it has a fairly small range, it has an estimated population of 20,000 to 50,000 mature individuals that is believed to be stable. No immediate threats have been identified. It is "[f]airly common to common within its small range, and tolerant of substantial habitat modification" and little affected by the pet trade.

References

sulphur-winged parakeet
Birds of the Talamancan montane forests
sulphur-winged parakeet